The Baptist Community of the Congo River is a Baptist Christian denomination in Democratic Republic of the Congo. It is affiliated with the Church of Christ in the Congo and the Baptist World Alliance. The headquarters is in Kinshasa.

History
The Baptist Community of the Congo River has its origins in a Baptist mission established along the Congo River, in 1880, by Thomas J. Comber and George Grenfell of the Baptist Missionary Society.  
In 1960, the Lower River Baptist Church, the Upper Congo Baptist Church and the Middle River Baptist Church joined forces to form the Zaire River Baptist Community.  In 2006, the denomination had 221 churches and 274,092 members.  According to a denomination census released in 2020, it claimed 2,668 churches and 1,760,634 members.

See also 
 Bible
 Born again
 Baptist beliefs
 Worship service (evangelicalism)
 Jesus Christ
 Believers' Church

References

External links
 Official Website 

Baptist denominations in Africa
Evangelicalism in the Democratic Republic of the Congo